Lost Face is a collection of seven short stories by Jack London. It takes its name from the first short story in the book, about a European adventurer in the Yukon who outwits his (American) Indian captors' plans to torture him. The book includes London's best-known short story, "To Build a Fire".

List of Stories
 Lost Face
 Trust
 To Build a Fire
 That Spot
 Flush of Gold
 The Passing of Marcus O’Brien
 The Wit of Porportuk

External links
 
 
 Jack London: Lost Face
 , Vol. 46 includes three of the short stories from this book

Short story collections by Jack London
1910 short story collections
Macmillan Publishers books